Jason Santos is a Boston-based restaurateur, cookbook author, runner-up on Hell’s Kitchen and has appeared on Bar Rescue seasons 5, 6, 7, and 8. He returned to Season 21 of Hell's Kitchen as Gordon Ramsay's sous-chef when the season debuted in September 2022. It was a role he had in the season that started in January 2021. He went by Jay in his earlier appearances on Hell’s Kitchen but goes by Jason now.

Santos, as well as his Buttermilk & Bourbon restaurants, are known for their New Orleans inspired food.

Career

Santos has been executive chef and owner of three Boston restaurants: Abby Lane (in the Boston Theater District), Citrus & Salt (Back Bay, Boston) and Buttermilk & Bourbon. He also owns B&B Fish (opened November 2020) in Marblehead, Massachusetts and in 2021, announced that in July 2021, Santos and his partners would open a spot in Arsenal Yards, Watertown, Massachusetts.  The Buttermilk & Bourbon location actually opened on August 5, 2021.

His restaurant Blue Inc. closed in September 2014.

Very early in his career, he worked for Andy Husbands at Tremont 647 where he spent six years before going on to become Executive Chef at Gargoyles on the Square in 2005.  His “innovative cuisine transformed the restaurant from neighborhood stalwart to out-of-town dining destination.” His food has been described as Julia Child  meets Willy Wonka“”. 

At both Boston University and Cambridge Rindge and Latin School, Santos has taught culinary courses.

Cookbooks

Buttermilk & Bourbon: New Orleans Recipes with a Modern Flair was published in March 2019. In December 2022, a cookbook for home cooks called Simple Fancy is expected to be released.

Personal life

Santos and his wife Thuy (née Le) are parents of a daughter, born in August 2022.

When he appeared on Season 7 of Hell’s Kitchen, he lived in Medford, Massachusetts and worked as an executive chef at Gargoyles on the Square in Somerville, Massachusetts.  He returned to Gargoyles at the end of the season.

Santos graduated from Newbury College.  In 2021, it was reported Santos and his wife lived in Woburn, Massachusetts.

References

External links
Chef Jason Santos IN STUDIO With Morning MAGIC

1976 births
Living people
American cookbook writers
American male chefs
American restaurateurs
Bar Rescue
Chefs from Massachusetts
Hell's Kitchen (American TV series)
Restaurant founders
Newbury College (United States) alumni
American television chefs
Reality cooking competition contestants
People from Woburn, Massachusetts
People from Medford, Massachusetts